Córdoba Province may refer to:
 Córdoba Province, Argentina
 Córdoba Province (Colombia)
 Province of Córdoba (Spain)

Province name disambiguation pages